"Why Not?" is a song released by the South Korean girl group Loona. It was released on October 19, 2020, as the lead single from their third mini-album [12:00].

Composition and lyrics
Billboard described the song as "shapeshifting". The song is an uptempo electropop, electroclash and funk song with influences of future bass. In a press release members of the group said the lyrics of the song are about "pursuing freedom and individualistic self".

Music video
The music video for the song was released on the same day as the song. The video amassed over 2.3 million views in its first 24 hours of release. As of June 26, 2021, the music video has more than 35 million views between the upload on Loona's YouTube channel and the upload on 1TheK's YouTube channel.

Synopsis
The visuals of the music video were described as "celestial" and "mystical". The members are seen dancing in the middle of trashed grocery store, on the surface of the moon, and skipping in circles around a fire as the Earth looms behind them. The girls later return to Earth to float through fields filled with levitating orbs, dance on ceilings rimmed in neon, and joyfully run through clouds of colorful chalk.

Live performance
Loona performed the song for the first time on its release day at the Blue Square iMarket Hall in Hannam-dong, central Seoul, during the song's showcase.

Charts

Release history

References

2020 songs
2020 singles
Loona (group) songs
Blockberry Creative singles
Song recordings produced by Will Simms
Songs written by Will Simms